Søren Norby Islands, named after Søren Norby, is an uninhabited archipelago close to the shores of Eastern Greenland. Administratively it is part of the Sermersooq municipality.

Geography
The archipelago is located on the southern side of Pikiulleq Bay. It includes a long coastal island and a great number of offshore islets and rocks, the largest of which is Pros Mund Island. 

The main island, Jens Munk Island is located north of the Fridtjof Nansen Peninsula, separated from the mainland by a 45 km long sound named Kagssortoq (Kattertooq), which has a width ranging between 0.7 and 6.5 km. The southern part of the island has an ice cap. 

Jens Munk Island has an area of 470.7 km2 and a shoreline of 185.9 kilometres. Its southernmost point is Cape Lovelorn, projecting from a steep 280 m high headland at the northern limit of Umivik Bay.

See also
List of islands of Greenland

References

Uninhabited islands of Greenland
Sermersooq